Belle Vista is an extinct town in Glynn County in the U.S. state of Georgia.

History
A post office called "Bellvista" was in operation from 1889 until 1895. "Belle Vista" translates to "beautiful view" in French.

See also
List of ghost towns in Georgia

References

Geography of Glynn County, Georgia
Ghost towns in Georgia (U.S. state)